The Man versus Horse Marathon is an annual race over , where runners compete against riders on horseback through a mix of road, trail and mountainous terrain.  The race, which is a shorter distance than an official marathon road race, takes place in the Welsh town of Llanwrtyd Wells every June. There are other Man versus Horse races — in Scotland based at Dores, near Loch Ness, in Central North Island, New Zealand and in Prescott, Arizona.

History

The event started in 1980, when local landlord Gordon Green overheard a discussion between two men in his pub, the Neuadd Arms. One man suggested that over a significant distance across country, man was equal to any horse. Green decided that the challenge should be tested in full public view, and organised the first event.

The first woman to run the race was Ann King in 1981. In 1982, the route of the course was amended slightly to give a more even match between the competitors. The course is slightly shorter than a traditional marathon at a reported 22 miles, but over rougher terrain. In 1985, cyclists were allowed to compete too – and that year, U.S. ladies' champion cyclist Jacquie Phelan narrowly lost to the first horse. In 1989, British cyclist Tim Gould beat the first horse by three minutes – the first time that a horse was beaten by a human in the race.

In 2004, the 25th race was won by Huw Lobb in 2 hours, 5 minutes and 19 seconds. It was the first time that a man racing on foot has won the race, thereby winning the prize fund of £25,000, which had been growing by £1,000 each year from the race's inception until claimed by a winning runner. The year's race also saw the highest ever number of competitors; 500 runners and 40 horses. The feat was repeated in 2007, when human competitors outpaced the first equine competitor by up to 11 minutes.

The 2009 race was marred by controversy when the organizers deducted time spent in the 'vet checks' from the horse times in addition to the 15 minutes for the delayed start of the horses. The deduction of this additional time enabled the horse to triumph by 8 minutes, instead of being defeated by 2. Whilst the organizers at the time claimed that the time spent in the vet check (which is not accurately monitored on a horse-by-horse basis) had always been deducted, this had not occurred in previous years. The fastest runner, Martin Cox, refused to accept the winner's trophy in protest at the decision. Following protests from other competitors, the organizers reverted to the previously followed rules of only deducting 15 minutes for the 2010 edition of the race. However, despite Haggai Chepkwony running the fastest time since Huw Lobb's record-breaking effort in 2004, a horse triumphed by 10 minutes. 2011 featured a number of very good riders and horses competing, and the wet track conditions favored horses over runners, but some very good times were recorded by the front runners. The winning rider was Beti Gordon riding Next in Line at Grangeway, while the top runner was Charlie Pearson from London.

2012 saw the return of Huw Lobb, the runner who first beat the horse and landed £25,000 as a bonus. His winning time was, however, considerably down on his winning time from 2004. Coming third in the Cork Marathon just five days earlier may have contributed to his running slower than perhaps he might have been able to. In 2013, extensive forestry works meant the organizers had to modify the route considerably, resulting in a course of nearly 24 miles, instead of the usual route of just under 21 miles. Despite a very hot day, the longer and hillier course favoured the horses, with 2011 winner Beti Gordon comfortably beating the first man, Hugh Aggleton.

The 2013 race attracted an entry of 65 horses, with 44 completing the course, enabling it to lay claim to being "the world's largest horse race". Following a number of criticisms of the extended course in 2013 and 2014, the course for 2015 was shortened back towards 21 miles. This provided a more even match between man and equine, with Geoffrey Allen on Leo emerging victorious by just over 10 minutes from Hugh Aggleton. It was Allen's 4th outright win, and his 5th time as first horseman, having been beaten by Florian Holzinger in 2007.

Winners

Note that the times are not necessarily comparable from year to year due to changes of the rules and the course layout.

References

External links
Official Site

Marathons in the United Kingdom
Sports competitions in Wales
Recurring sporting events established in 1980
Llanwrtyd Wells
Summer events in Wales
Novelty running